Ace is a  yacht built by Lürssen. She was delivered to her owner Yuriy Kosiuk in July 2012. The yacht accommodates 10 guests and 28 crew members. Her exterior and interior were both created by Andrew Winch Designs. One of ACE’s interior features is the spa. The spa includes a hammam, massage room, plunge pool and a Jacuzzi. Other features are a beach club, gym, movie theater, toys & tenders and helicopter landing capabilities.

Design 
Ace is known for being one of the first yachts for which a special Support ship was purpose built. This Support ship was built in 2012 at Damen Shipyards in Holland. The yacht is classed with Lloyd's Register and registered in the Cayman Islands.

Specifications 
 Length:  overall
 Beam: 
 Draught: 
 Tonnage: 2,732 gross tons
 Hull Material: Steel
 Superstructure Material: Steel and aluminium
 Number of Engines: 2
 Engines type: MTU Friedrichshafen 16V4000M61
 HP: 2 x 
 Max Speed: 
 Cruise Speed:

See also
 Damen
 Lürssen
 List of yachts built by Lürssen
 List of motor yachts by length

References

2010 ships
Motor yachts
Ships built in Germany